The men's 50 metre rifle prone team competition at the 2010 Asian Games in Guangzhou, China was held on 15 November at the Aoti Shooting Range.

Schedule
All times are China Standard Time (UTC+08:00)

Records

Results

References

ISSF Results Overview

External links
Official website

Men Rifle 50 P T